Genius and Figure (Spanish:"Genio y figura") is a 1953 Mexican film. It stars Luis Aguilar and Antonio Badú.

Plot
Antonio is a player who abandoned his woman as soon as she gives birth. Antonio's friend Luis, will do his best to make him go back to his family.

External links
 

1953 films
1950s Spanish-language films
Mexican black-and-white films
Mexican comedy films
1953 comedy films
1950s Mexican films